LFK may refer to:
 Lycée Français de Koweït
 Lycée Français de Kyoto
 LFK NG by MBDA Deutschland GmbH